Metis Polytechnic is a polytechnic and technology school in Haryana established in 2008. It is affiliated to the Directorate of Technical Education (DTE), Panchkula and provides Diploma level technical education to its students.

Introduction
Metis Polytechnic is one of the few polytechnic institutes in the city of Jind, established in the year 2008. Since its inception, this institute has established itself among the polytechnic institutes of Haryana. The Polytechnic is affiliated to the Directorate of Technical Education and All India Council of Technical Education (AICTE). It was established by Northern Educational Trust which is the base of other Metis Institutes also.

Admission Procedure
Prospective students must appear for a Diploma Entrance Test conducted by the State Board of Technical Education (SBTE). The minimum eligibility to qualify for the CET is 45% for general category and 40% for the reserved categories in Secondary School Examination.

Programs
Metis Polytechnic has three year Diploma in Technology Programs in

 Civil Engineering
 Electrical Engineering
 Electronics & Communication Engineering 
 Computer Engineering
 Mechanical Engineering

Training and Placement
Metis Polytechnic has a separate Training and Placement department. The Training and Placement Officer is responsible for the arrangements of any on Campus interviews for Metis Polytechnic.

References

External links 

Universities and colleges in Haryana
Engineering colleges in Haryana
All India Council for Technical Education
Educational institutions established in 2008
2008 establishments in Haryana